Euprymna penares is a species of bobtail squid native to waters of the Indo-Pacific; its exact distribution is unknown. Little is known about the size range of this species.

The type specimen was collected off Singapore and is deposited at The Natural History Museum in London.

The validity of E. penares has been questioned.

References

External links

Bobtail squid
Cephalopods described in 1849
Taxa named by John Edward Gray